The 2021 Guaranteed Rate Bowl was a college football bowl game played on December 28, 2021, with kickoff at 10:15 p.m. EST (8:15 p.m. local MST) and televised on ESPN. It was the 32nd edition of the Guaranteed Rate Bowl, although the first played under that name (the 2020 edition was canceled due to an insufficient number of teams being available to fill all bowl slots) and was one of the 2021–22 bowl games concluding the 2021 FBS football season. Residential mortgage company Guaranteed Rate was the game's title sponsor.

Teams
Consistent with conference tie-ins, the game was played between teams from the Big 12 Conference and the Big Ten Conference.

This was first time that Minnesota and West Virginia ever played each other.

West Virginia Mountaineers

West Virginia finished their regular season with an overall 6–6 record, 4–5 in Big 12 games. After starting their season with four losses in their first six games, the Mountaineers won four of their final six games to become bowl eligible. West Virginia played four ranked opponents, losing to Oklahoma and Oklahoma State while defeating Virginia Tech and Iowa State.

Minnesota Golden Gophers

Minnesota finished their regular season with an overall 8–4 record, 6–3 in Big Ten games. The Golden Gophers were ranked 20th after winning six of their first eight games, but then lost two of their final four games. Minnesota played three ranked teams, losing to Ohio State and Iowa while defeating Wisconsin.

Game summary

Statistics

References

Externals links
Game statistics at statbroadcast.com

Guaranteed Rate Bowl
Guaranteed Rate Bowl
Minnesota Golden Gophers football bowl games
West Virginia Mountaineers football bowl games
Guaranteed Rate Bowl
Guaranteed Rate Bowl